Beraea is a genus of insects in the family Beraeidae.

The genus was described in 1833 by Stephens.

The genus has cosmopolitan distribution.

Species:
 Beraea maurus (Curtis, 1834)
 Beraea pullata (Curtis, 1834)

References

Trichoptera
Trichoptera genera